The Jonathan Hammond House is a historic house at 311 Beaver Street in Waltham, Massachusetts.  The -story wood-frame house was built in 1785 by Jonathan Hammond, member of a prominent local family.  The house has transitional late Georgian/early Federal styling, and is one of the more substantial houses of the period to survive in the city.  It has also been owned by the Lymans and the Warrens, also locally prominent families.

The house was listed on the National Register of Historic Places in 1989.  It is now owned by Bentley University and houses some of its offices.

See also
Ephraim Hammond House
National Register of Historic Places listings in Waltham, Massachusetts

References

Houses completed in 1785
Houses on the National Register of Historic Places in Waltham, Massachusetts
Georgian architecture in Massachusetts
Houses in Waltham, Massachusetts
Bentley University